Kostas Stamatis (in ; born 1990) is a Greek professional basketball player. He is 1.84 m (6 ft 0.5 in) in height and plays at the point guard position. He is currently playing with Cretan club Ergotelis in the Greek B Basket League.

References

1990 births
Living people
Greek men's basketball players
Greek Basket League players
AEK B.C. players
Livadeia B.C. players
Ergotelis B.C. players
Point guards